Bretthausen is an Ortsgemeinde – a community belonging to a Verbandsgemeinde – in the Westerwaldkreis in Rhineland-Palatinate, Germany.

Geography

The community lies in the Westerwald between Siegen and Limburg an der Lahn. Bretthausen belongs to the Verbandsgemeinde of Rennerod, a kind of collective municipality.

History
About 1300, Bretthausen had its first documentary mention.

Politics

Community council
The council is made up of 6 council members who were elected in a majority vote in a municipal election on 7 June 2009.

Coat of arms
The community's arms are in the tinctures blue, red, gold and silver, which refer to the community's territorial allegiances over the ages. The three golden ears of grain symbolize agriculture's importance. The two flax blossoms refer to the linen industry. The wavy fess stands for the river Große Nister. The belltower stands for the school built in the community in 1910.

Economy and infrastructure

Right near the community, Bundesstraßen 54, linking Limburg an der Lahn and Siegen, and 414 from Hohenroth to Hachenburg, cross each other. The nearest Autobahn interchange is Herborn on the A 45 (Dortmund–Aschaffenburg), some 20 km away. The nearest InterCityExpress stop is the railway station at Montabaur on the Cologne-Frankfurt high-speed rail line.

References

External links
 Bretthausen in the collective municipality’s Web pages 

Municipalities in Rhineland-Palatinate
Westerwaldkreis